Pseudocoremia melinata is a moth of the family Geometridae. It is endemic to New Zealand.

The larvae feed on a Carmichaelia.

References

Boarmiini
Moths of New Zealand
Endemic fauna of New Zealand
Moths described in 1874
Endemic moths of New Zealand